Federico II of Gonzaga (17 May 1500 – 28 August 1540) was the ruler of the Italian city of Mantua (first as Marquis, later as Duke) from 1519 until his death. He was also Marquis of Montferrat from 1536.

Biography

Federico was son of Francesco II Gonzaga, Marquess of Mantua and Isabella d'Este. Due to the turbulent politics of the time, from the age of ten, he spent three years as a hostage in Rome under Pope Julius II. From 1515 to 1517, Federico was the hostage of King Francis I of France, to ensure Gonzaga assistance in Italy.

On 3 April 1519, Federico succeeded his father as Marquis of Mantua, initially under the regency of his mother and his uncles Sigismondo and Giovanni Gonzaga. He received the imperial investiture from emperor Charles V on 7 April 1521. Pope Leo X named him Captain General of the Church (commander in chief of the Papal Army) in July 1521, and he fought against the French at Parma in 1521 and at Piacenza in 1522.

Federico signed a marriage contract with the heir to the Marquisate of Monteferrat, Maria Palaeologina, with the aim of acquiring that land. In 1528, however, in exchange for two prisoners, Pope Clement VII voided the marriage contract.

Federico then signed another marriage contract with Charles V's third cousin, Julia of Aragon. In lieu of this move, in 1530 he was granted the ducal title, whereby their dynasty became Dukes of Mantua. However, when Boniface died by a fall from horse on 25 March of that year, Federico paid 50,000 ducats to Charles in exchange for the annulment of the contract, and pushed the pope for the restoration of his earlier marriage agreement. When Maria also died, he was able to marry her sister Margaret on 3 October 1531. At the death of the last legitimate male heir of the Palaiologos family, Giovanni Giorgio (1533), the marquisate of Montferrat passed to the Gonzaga, who held it until the 18th century.

Like his parents, he was a patron of the arts; he commissioned the Palazzo Te, designed and decorated by Giulio Romano, as his summer palace just outside Mantua. Romano spent 16 years as court artist under Federico's patronage. He also bought and commissioned several paintings from Titian, and had his portrait painted by both Titian and Raphael.

Federico suffered long from syphilis, like his father. He died on 28 June 1540 at his villa at Marmirolo. His son Francesco briefly held the title of 2nd Duke of Mantua before dying in his teens; the second son, Gugliemo, became 3rd Duke of Mantua as well as Duke of Montferrat and carried on the line.

Family and issue

Federico and Margaret were parents to seven children:

Eleonora Gonzaga.
Anna Gonzaga.
Francesco III Gonzaga, Duke of Mantua (10 March 1533 - 22 February 1550)
Isabella Gonzaga, married Francesco Ferdinando d'Ávalos
Guglielmo Gonzaga, Duke of Mantua (24 April 1538 - 14 August 1587), married Archduchess Eleanor of Austria
Louis Gonzaga, Duke of Nevers (22 October 1539 - 23 October 1595). Father of Charles I, Duke of Mantua
Cardinal Federico Gonzaga (1540 - 21 February 1565).

Ancestry

See also
Sack of Rome
Italian Wars

References

Sources

External links

Biography 

|-

|-

1500 births
1540 deaths
Federico 2
Federico 2
Federico 2
Federico 2 of
16th-century Italian nobility
Burials at the Palatine Basilica of Santa Barbara (Mantua)
Captains General of the Church